Baptistown is an unincorporated community located within Kingwood Township, in Hunterdon County, New Jersey, United States. The township's municipal offices are located in Baptistown just north of the center of the community.

History
Baptistown is named for the two Baptist churches which were founded there by early settlers.

Baptistown has a post office with ZIP code 08803, which opened on May 1, 1822.

In 1882, Baptistown had a population of 250, and was described as "the centre of a rich farming district, with a good local business".

In 1937 there was a one-room school in Baptistown.

Solar farms
Frenchtown Solar is a group of three photovoltaic arrays, or solar farms, in the state covering  with 68,500 solar panels and 20.1 megawatt capacity.  Two arrays are located just outside the village Baptistown on Route 12. The third and largest is to the south off County Route 519.

References

Kingwood Township, New Jersey
Unincorporated communities in Hunterdon County, New Jersey
Unincorporated communities in New Jersey